Broad Sound Islands National Park, also known as Broad Sounds Islands, is a national park in Shire of Livingstone, Queensland, Australia,  northwest of Brisbane.

The park covers 48 islands from Flock Pigeon Island (near Clairview on the mainland) through to High Peak Island (the furthest from any port). Four of the islands are officially known as Broad Sound Islands (Long, Tern, Quail and Wild Duck Islands), while many others form part of the larger island chain known as the Northumberland Islands. 

Due to its remoteness and undisturbed nature, this park is a real paradise for nesting endangered species of flatback turtles.

The average summer temperature on the islands is 30 degrees, and the winter 23 degrees Celsius.

See also

 Northumberland Islands National Park
 Protected areas of Queensland

References 

National parks of Queensland
North Queensland